Jenelli Fraser (born July 7, 1991) is a Belizean beauty pageant titleholder who was crowned Miss Universe Belize 2018. As Miss Universe Belize, she represented Belize at Miss Universe 2018.

Pageantry
In the months leading up to the pageant, Fraser said that it was "very difficult" to enter the pageant, due to financial issues. In an interview with LOVE FM, she said:

Miss Universe Belize 2018
On August 25, 2018, Fraser was crowned Miss Universe Belize 2018 by outgoing titleholder Rebecca Rath.

References

External links

1991 births
Living people
Belizean beauty pageant winners